"Grande grande grande" is a 1972 Italian song, written by David William Moncrief, and composed by Alberto Testa and Tony Renis. It was a No. 1 hit for Mina in Italy and for Shirley Bassey released as "Never Never Never" in the U.K., U.S. and Australia. The 1973 Shirley Bassey single achieved sales of over 50,000 copies in Australia, being eligible for the award of a Gold Disc.

Mina version
"Grande grande grande" was a  No. 1 hit on the Italian Singles Chart for Mina in 1972, from her No. 1 self-titled album. The single was released in early 1972 and entered the Top 10 the week of 26 February.

After a steady climb to No. 2 (behind "Imagine" by John Lennon) the week of 11 March, the song seemed to have run out of steam after falling 2 places to No. 4 to new hits by Delirium, Nicola Di Bari and Nada ("Imagine" had dropped to No. 5). By 1 April the song had once again climbed to its peak No. 2 position where it remained the whole month of April before finally reaching No. 1 on 29 April . "Grande grande grande",  arranged by Pino Presti, ruled the charts the first three weeks of May until "I giardini di marzo" by her collaborator Lucio Battisti, and her own hit "Parole parole" knocked it out of the top spot down to No. 3 the week of 27 May. "Grande grande grande"  remained in the top 10 until the week of 8 July, often trading places with "Parole parole". By the year's end, only "Il Padrino" by Santo and Johnny had enjoyed a longer life on the charts and Mina had to settle for the runner up position for 1972's biggest hit on the Italian singles chart.

Mina also recorded the song in English and Spanish.

Personnel 

Mina : vocals
Pino Presti: arrangement, orchestra conductor, bass
Dario Baldan Bembo: organ
Andrea Sacchi: electric and acoustic guitar
Massimo Verardi: electric guitar
Bruno De Filippi: harmonica
Gianni Cazzola: drums
Mario Lamberti: congas
Gianni Bedori: flute
Al Korvin, Oscar Valdambrini, Fermo Lini, Giuliano Bernicchi: trumpets
Sergio Almangano, Arturo Prestipino Giarritta: first violins

Charts

Cover versions
 Shirley Bassey had a No. 8 hit in the UK with "Never Never Never", an English version with lyrics by Norman Newell. It was also No. 1 in Australia, No. 1 in South Africa, No. 3 in Singapore, and her only single to make three US charts: No. 48 on the Billboard Hot 100, No. 8 on the Adult Contemporary Chart, and No. 67 on the R&B Chart. It is also a concert staple.
 Orietta Berti
 Mary Byrne for album ...with Love.
 Lydia Canaan ("Never Never Never")
 Vikki Carr
 Chiara Civello covered this song for his album Canzoni as "Never Never Never" (2014)
 Celine Dion with Luciano Pavarotti 1997 (Released as "I Hate You Then I Love You")
 Sergio Franchi covered this song in English ("Never Never Never") on his 1976 DynaHouse Album 20 Magnificent Songs.
 John Holt ("Never Never Never")
 Julio Iglesias with Nana Mouskouri. Iglesias also sang covers in languages such as Spanish, English, Italian, Portuguese and French.
 Mireille Mathieu Folle, follement heureuse
 David McAlmont covered this song for his album Set One: You Go To My Head
 Erlend Øye
 Pimpinela
 Zizi Possi for the album "Passione".
 Conny Vandenbos as "Waarom waarom waarom" on her album Een vrouw van deze tijd (1974)
 Dana Winner & Frank Galan
 Marina Dale Australia produced by Duane d Zigliotto.
 Giuliano Palma & The Bluebeaters covered this song for the album The Album (2000)
 Betty Padgett covered this song for her album Betty Padgett (1976)

References 

Italian songs
1972 singles
Shirley Bassey songs
Songs with music by Tony Renis
Songs with lyrics by Alberto Testa (lyricist)
Mina (Italian singer) songs
1972 songs
Number-one singles in Australia
Number-one singles in Italy
Number-one singles in South Africa
PDU singles